Caxton Street is a street in the Brisbane suburb of Petrie Terrace in Queensland, Australia. It forms part of the Petrie Terrace Heritage Trail.

History

Named after merchant, writer and printer William Caxton, the thoroughfare developed considerably alongside the subdivision of land in the 1860s. The ensuing decades saw the construction of The Caxton Hotel (1864), the Baroona Oddfellows hall (1883) and the Prince Alfred Hotel (1887). An electric tramline was constructed between 1897 and 1898. The Ithaca Baths were constructed around 1905.

In order to ease congestion, the street was grade-separated at its intersection with Hale Street in the 1960s.

Since the 1980s, Caxton Street has established itself as a thriving nightlife precinct, with an array of nightclubs, restaurants and live entertainment venues. The Caxton Street Seafood and Wine Festival has been held in the street annually since 1994. Caxton Street is also famous for the 'running of the buses', an annual event during the Australian Rugby League's State of Origin series, at which thousands of fans flock to the street in order to cheer their team's bus and boo their respective opposition as they proceed to Lang Park.

During the 2014 G-20 Brisbane summit, Burmese president Thein Sein and German chancellor Angela Merkel, as well as delegates of the United Nations, reportedly stayed at Gambaro's Hotel, located on the street. During her visit, Merkel stopped in at bars on Caxton Street and posed for photos with locals. During this time a strong police presence was present on Caxton street, along with a high protective steel and perspex barrier outside the hotel.

Major intersections

 Petrie Terrace
 Hale Street
 Castlemaine Street / Dowse Street

See also
 Caxton Street Seafood and Wine Festival

References

External links

Streets in Brisbane
Restaurant districts and streets in Australia